This is a list of islands of the U.S. state of Alaska. Approximately 2,670 named islands help to make Alaska the largest state in the United States.

A

B

C

D

E

F

G

H

I

J

K

L

M

N

O

P

Q

R

S

T

U

V

W

Y

Z

See also
List of lakes of Alaska
List of rivers of Alaska
List of waterfalls of Alaska

Notes

USGS GNIS named islands by Borough or Census Area:

References

General references

Islands

Alaska